The following are international rankings of Shanghai by categories.

Overall 

Overall Rankings

Education 
Educational Rankings

Environment 
Environmental Rankings

Globalisation 
Global City Rankings

Economy and Finance 
Economic and financial rankings

Living 
Living rankings

References 

Shanghai
Shanghai